This is a list of films which have placed number one at the box office in Italy during 1993. Amounts are in lire and are based on a sample of key cities.

See also
 Lists of box office number-one films

References

1993
Italy
Box